Thomas Gatch Melish (October 28, 1876 – February 15, 1948) was an American entrepreneur and coin collector. In the 1930s, Melish was responsible for two United States commemorative coin issues, the Cincinnati Musical Center half dollar and the Cleveland Centennial half dollar.

Melish was a descendant of Jacob Bromwell, founder of Jacob Bromwell, Inc.

References

1876 births
1948 deaths
American collectors
Businesspeople from Cincinnati